Pigritia stips is a moth in the family Blastobasidae. It is found in Costa Rica.

The length of the forewings is 4.2–4.9 mm. The forewings have brown scales tipped with pale-brown intermixed with pale-brown scales or pale brown intermixed with brownish-orange scales. The hindwings are translucent pale brown, gradually darkening towards the apex.

Etymology
The specific name is derived from Latin stips (meaning a small coin).

References

Moths described in 2013
Blastobasidae